Fair trade is a social movement to help producers in developing countries achieve better trading conditions.

Fairtrade or fair trade may also refer to:

 World Fair Trade Organisation, a global community of verified Fair Trade Enterprises
 Fair trade law, a law in the United States permitting manufacturers to specify a minimum retail price
 Fair Trade Certified Mark
 Fair trade certification
 Fairtrade certification, a widespread standard for labelling products produced by fair trade, overseen by FLO International
 Fairtrade International, Fairtrade, Fairtrade Labelling Organizations International e.V. (FLO), FLO International 
 Fair Trade Services, an American record label
 FLOCert
 Office of Fair Trading
 Trade justice, efforts to counteract unfair consequences of globalisation and of free trade
 "Fair Trade" (Land of the Lost), an episode of the 1974 television series
 "Fair Trade" (Star Trek: Voyager), an episode of the television series
 "Fair Trade" (song), a song by Drake from his 2021 album Certified Lover Boy

See also
Fair trading (disambiguation)